Narvi may refer to:
Narfi, a character from Norse Mythology (also called Narvi)
, in the Gulf of Finland
Narvi (moon), a moon of Saturn
Narvi, Iran, a village in Kermanshah Province, Iran